Allahgulular is a village de facto in the Shushi Province of the self-proclaimed Republic of Artsakh, de jure in the Shusha District of Azerbaijan.

References

External links 
 

Populated places in Shusha District